Rust is an iron oxide formed by the reaction of iron and oxygen in the presence of water.

Rust may also refer to:

Science and technology
 Rust (color), an orange-brown color resembling iron oxide
 Rust (programming language), a systems programming language focused on performance and safety

Plant fungal diseases
 Rust (fungus), a range of diseases caused by fungi of the order Pucciniales
 Stem rust of cereals 
 Brown rust of sugarcane 
 Brown wheat rust, affects cereal crops
 Cedar-hawthorn rust
 Cedar-quince rust
 Common rust of corn 
  Crown rust of oats and ryegrass, affects oat plants and also buckthorn
 Cedar-apple rust, affects apples, pears and hawthorn
 Coffee rust, affects coffee plants
 Japanese apple rust
 Juniper rust, affects hawthorn
 Kern's pear rust
 Orange rust of sugarcane 
 Pacific coast pear rust
 Pear rust
 Soybean rust, a fungal disease affecting soybeans
 Witches broom rust
 Yellow Rust, affects cereal crops.

Places

Europe
 Rust, Baden-Württemberg, a town in Germany
 Europapark Rust, a theme park in Germany
 Rust, Burgenland, in Burgenland, Austria
 Rust im Tullnerfeld, in Lower Austria

United States
 El Cerrito, California, formerly known as Rust 
 Rust Belt, a northeastern region
 Rust Township, Michigan

Arts and entertainment

Films
 Rust (2010 film), a drama bankrolled by the town of Kipling, Saskatchewan, Canada
 Rust (2018 film), a Brazilian film
 Rust (upcoming film), notable for an on-set shooting incident

Music
 RUST (band), a Finnish rock band
 Rust (album), a 2015 album by Harm's Way
 "Rust" (song), a 1999 song by Echo & the Bunnymen
 Rust, a 2003 song by Darkthrone  from the album Hate Them
 "Rust", a 2015 song by Caligula's Horse from the album Bloom
 Rust Records, NY, a former record label

Other
 Rust (video game), a video game developed by Facepunch Studios
 Rust Monster, a fictional monster from the role-playing game Dungeons & Dragons

People
 Rust (surname)

See also
 Russ (disambiguation)
 Rusty (disambiguation)